Keelappoongudi is a panchayat Village in Sivaganga district in the Indian state of Tamil Nadu. This village is under the control of Sivaganga block. Sivaganga taluk

References

Villages in Sivaganga district